Works about Community Broadcasting:

 Sex and Broadcasting (1971 book), by Lorenzo Milam
 Sex and Broadcasting (2014 documentary), about WFMU